Austal Limited is an Australian-based global ship building company and defence prime contractor that specialises in the design, construction and support of defence and commercial vessels. Austal's product range includes naval vessels, high-speed ferries, and supply or crew transfer vessels for offshore windfarms and oil and gas platforms.

Austal has three major ship building facilities. Defence vessels are designed and constructed in Henderson, Western Australia and Mobile, Alabama. Commercial vessels are constructed in Balamban, Philippines. Vessel support is provided through service centres located in Darwin, Cairns and Henderson in Australia; San Diego, California; Balamban, Philippines and Muscat, Oman. Corporate headquarters are co-located at Austal's Australian ship building facility in Henderson.

 Austal has designed and constructed over 260 vessels for numerous defence forces and commercial fleet operators. Customers include the Australian Border Force, Condor Ferries, Mols Linien of Denmark, Royal Australian Navy, Royal Navy of Oman, and United States Navy.

Products

Littoral Combat Ship (LCS)

In October 2005, Austal / General Dynamics was awarded a contract to build the first unit from its design for a Littoral Combat Ship. It is now operating with the fleet at its current location in Norfolk, Virginia.

LCS-2 was the first ship built by Austal USA for the US Navy and the Navy's first trimaran Littoral Combat Ship. It is the first naval warship constructed in Mobile, Alabama since World War II. The basis of Austal's seaframe design was the  trimaran hull .

The second Austal/General Dynamics ship, LCS-4, was cancelled on 1 November 2007. 
 
On 1 May 2009, the US Navy renewed the contract with Austal/General Dynamics to build the second LCS, with delivery scheduled for May 2012.

On 29 December 2010 the US Navy announced a new contract with Austal USA after Austal severed ties with General Dynamics Bath Iron Works. New contracts for Littoral Combat Ships were awarded to both Austal USA and Lockheed Martin. The contract called for one ship to be built beginning in 2010, one to be built in 2011, and two per year from 2012 to 2015. The LCS-6 contract was for US$432 million, with a goal of having the average ship cost US$352 million each. Another US$20 million was figured in for change orders, and a management reserve.

Expeditionary Fast Transport (EPF)

In November 2008, Austal was awarded a contract to design and build the US military's next-generation, high-speed catamaran, the Spearhead-class Expeditionary Fast Transport (EPF), which was formerly called the Joint High Speed Vessel (JHSV). The contract was part of a larger programme potentially worth over US$1.6 billion.

As the prime contractor, Austal was to design and construct the first  EPF, with options for nine additional vessels expected to be exercised between 2009 and 2013. Construction on the second ship started in September 2010. By the end of 2010, Austal had contracts for three ships, long-lead material contracts for two ships and options for five further ships, for a total of ten.

The EPF is similar to the Austal-built , which the US Marines had used since 2002.

While the EPF can carry 300 Marines and their gear for up to four days, it is not expected to be survivable against enemy attack.

In 2011, US Navy planners envisioned building up to two dozen of the EPF ships into the 2020s.

Cape-class patrol boats

Austal was awarded the contract for the design, construction and through-life support of the s for the Australian Customs and Border Protection Service in August 2011. The eight,  aluminium monohulls were delivered between March 2013 and August 2015.

Austal announced it has entered into a shipbuilding contract with the National Australia Bank to construct two further Cape-class patrol boats on 13 December 2015. The contract value is A$63 million. The two vessels will be delivered to the National Australia Bank in mid-2017 and subsequently chartered to the Commonwealth of Australia for a minimum term of three years. Austal did a similar off-balance-sheet charter with Westpac Express, which was chartered to the US Navy for 13 years.

In July 2018, the government of Trinidad and Tobago announced the acquisition of two Cape class patrol boats. The vessels will enhance the border protection capabilities of the country in conjunction with the existing Coast Guard fleet, and will join six Austal Fast Patrol Craft acquired in 2009.

In May 2020, a further six were ordered for the Royal Australian Navy.

Armidale-class patrol boats

Between June 2005 and February 2008, Austal delivered fourteen,  Armidale-class patrol boats to the Royal Australian Navy for coastal defence. The boats were featured on the TV series Sea Patrol.

P21-class patrol boats

In 2009, the Maritime Squadron of the Armed Forces of Malta ordered four patrol boats from Austal. They were due to replace the Swift-class patrol boats P23 and P24 which had been in commission since 1971 and the Bremse-class patrol boat P32 which had been in commission since 1992. The new vessels were built to Maltese specifications and were partly financed by the European Union.

The first two vessels were launched in October 2009. All four vessels were delivered to Malta in late 2009, and officially commissioned on 18 March 2010.

Yemeni Navy patrol boats

In 2005, Austal delivered ten high-speed patrol boats to the Yemeni Navy, which are commercially hired out to protect private shippers.

Omani Navy High Speed Support Vessels (HSSV)
In early 2014, Austal announced it had been awarded a US$124.9 million contract for two High Speed Support Vessels (HSSV) for the Royal Navy of Oman. Both were delivered to the Omani Navy by late 2016. The HSSV has a catamaran hull design similar to the US Navy's Expeditionary Fast Transport (EPF).

Commercial and leisure vessels

In the early 1990s, the ferry industry was transformed with the introduction of large, high-speed catamarans with decks for vehicles. They quickly replaced most hydrofoil and hovercraft services as well as many monohull ferries. The popularity of the new type of multi-hull design led to many shipyards worldwide changing their production to build fast aluminium catamarans. Eventually capacity exceeded demand and by the end of the 20th century most builders of large fast cats had ceased production. However Austal and its only competitor in this category, Hobart-based Incat survived the late 1990s industry collapse and the two companies continue to compete for orders of large multi-hull ferries of up to 11,000 gross tons with capacities of over 1,200 passengers and 400 vehicles.

On 20 August 2014, Austal announced the sale of Austal Hull 270, the company's  trimaran stock vessel, to the UK Channel Islands' ferry operator, Condor Ferries, for A$61.5 million, and was renamed .  Additionally, modifications to the stock vessel were valued at approximately A$6 million, and was scheduled to enter service in Spring 2015. On 28 March 2015, the ship struck the quayside while attempting to dock in Guernsey on its second day in service. The damage was only minor and above the waterline. Since then, Condor Liberation has had a difficult period of operation with Condor Ferries, encountering numerous technical problems, weather cancellations and sustaining further damage to its hull whilst docked in Poole on 30 December 2015.

See also
Alakai &  Huakai (Former Hawaii Superferry vessels, sold to the US Navy)
Cotai Jet
TurboJET
Chu Kong Passenger Transport
Pacific-class patrol boat

References

External links

Austal official website

Shipbuilding companies of Australia
Defence companies of Australia
Companies established in 1988
Manufacturing companies based in Perth, Western Australia
Companies listed on the Australian Securities Exchange
Australian brands